Twelvemile Township is an inactive township in Madison County, in the U.S. state of Missouri.

Twelvemile Township takes its name from Twelvemile Creek.

References

Townships in Missouri
Townships in Madison County, Missouri